Marwan Salim Kheireddine (born February 14, 1968) is a Lebanese banker and chairman of AM Bank.

Education 
Kheireddine earned a bachelor's degree in business administration and economics from Richmond University in the United Kingdom, and an MBA from Columbia Business School, New York.

Career 
Kheireddine played a role in the creation of BDL Intermediary Circular 331, a regulation that finances entrepreneurs.

Kheireddine founded the franchise of Virgin Megastores in Lebanon and the Kingdom of Saudi Arabia.

In parallel, from 1994 to 1999, Kheireddine served on the Board of the ‘Beirut Stock Exchange’ (BSE)  as financial advisor to the chairman, in addition to serving several terms on the board of the ‘Association of Banks of Lebanon’. He was a lecturer in finance at the American University of Beirut from 1993 till 2013.

Kheireddine is a founding member of the Young Presidents’ Organization (YPO)  - Lebanon chapter, created in 1999 and has since served in multiple positions including Chapter Chair, Education Officer, and Finance Officer. In addition he served as co-chair of the ‘YPO-London Business School Joint Executive Education Program’ from 2012 to 2014, where he also teaches an Introduction to Finance Session. He is also a founding member of the Young Arab Leaders and served as Lebanon's chapter first chairman.

In 2005, Kheireddine was elected to the American University of Beirut, Olayan School of Business, Middle East Advisory Board. In 2012, he joined the Board of Trustees of the American Community School of Lebanon. He also serves on the board of trustees at USEK University.

Kheireddine is also a founding member of the Board of Directors of the Lebanon Chapter of Endeavor. He serves as a board member of the Lebanese Center for Policy Studies (LCPS), a think tank.

Kheireddine served as Minister of State in the Government of Lebanon from July 2011 to February 2014.

In 2022, Kheireddine ran for parliament in Lebanon, but lost to Firas Hamdan.

References 

1968 births
Living people
People from Hasbaya
Government ministers of Lebanon
Lebanese Democratic Party politicians
Columbia Business School alumni
Academic staff of the American University of Beirut